Dasiosoma basilewskyi is a species of brown coloured ground beetle in the Lebiinae subfamily that is endemic to Democratic Republic of the Congo.

References

Beetles described in 2013
Beetles of the Democratic Republic of the Congo
Endemic fauna of the Democratic Republic of the Congo